Rive or La Rive may refer to:

Places
 Rive, Piedmont, Italy
 Rive d'Arcano, Friuli-Venezia Giulia, Italy
 Rive Droite, Paris, France
 Rive Gauche, Paris, France

People
 De la Rive, a surname and list of people
 Julie Rivé-King (1854-1937), American musician
 Lyndon Rive, cofounder of Solar City and cousin of Elon Musk
 Richard Rive (1931-1989), South African academic and writer
 Robert Rive, 19th century photographer

Other
 La Rive, a restaurant in Amsterdam, Netherlands
 La Rive Condominiums, Minneapolis, Minnesota, US
 Rive (video game), a 2016 platforming shoot-em-up video game
 Wood splitting, or riving

See also
 Longue-Rive, Quebec, Canada
 Belle Rive (disambiguation)
 Rives (disambiguation)
 Rivière (disambiguation)
 Ríos (disambiguation)
 Rio (disambiguation)
 Rivers (disambiguation)
 River (disambiguation)